Daniel Poohl, (born 11 August 1981 in Vänersborg) is a Swedish editor-in-chief for the Expo magazine. He started working at Expo at the age of twenty in 2001. Poohl became the editorial assistant after the death of Stieg Larsson in 2004 and became the editor-in-chief in 2006. Poohl grew up in Åsensbruk in Dalsland and studied media at Sinclairgymnasiet in Uddevalla. During his time at the national guard training he did journalism work for Värnpliktsnytt, a newspaper for the soldiers. Poohl became a known name in 2001 when he infiltrated the Nationaldemokraterna party to make a report that was broadcast on the show Folkhemmet on TV3.

Poohl is often used by media as a reference when it comes to questions about right-wing extremism and racism. For Dagens Nyheter, Svenska Dagbladet and Göteborgsposten. He writes articles about politics in Sweden for the English magazine Searchlight.

In 2013, Poohl wrote and published the book Som om vi hade glömt. And on 6 August 2015 he presented Sommar i P1 on Sveriges Radio.

References

External links 
 

1981 births
Living people
21st-century Swedish journalists
Swedish magazine editors
People from Vänersborg Municipality